Graham Charles Cumming (born 15 January 1941) is a Rhodesian former field hockey player. He competed in the men's tournament at the 1964 Summer Olympics.

References

External links
 

1941 births
Living people
Rhodesian male field hockey players
Olympic field hockey players of Rhodesia
Field hockey players at the 1964 Summer Olympics
Place of birth missing (living people)